Hualien is a railway station in Hualien City, Hualien County, Taiwan served by Taiwan Railways Administration. It is the terminal station of North-link line and the starting station of Taitung line.

Overview 
The station has two island platforms and one side platform. The station first opened on 17 February 1911 as "Karenkō Station". It was rebuilt in 2018 with a modern design and more retail space for food, drink, and gift shops.

Around the station 
 Hualien Al-Falah Mosque
 Hualien County Council
 Hualien County Stone Sculptural Museum
 Hualien Martyrs' Shrine
 Hualien Stadium
 Port of Hualien
 Tzu Chi University

See also
 List of railway stations in Taiwan
Next Station: 
(Towards Taitung Station) Ji'an Station
(Towards Taipei Station) Beipu Station

References

External links

Railway stations served by Taiwan Railways Administration
Railway stations in Hualien County
Rebuilt buildings and structures in Taiwan
Hualien City